Alessandro Proni (born 28 December 1982) is an Italian professional road bicycle racer, who last rode for UCI Professional Continental team .

Major results

2006
 3rd Trofeo Franco Balestra
2007
 1st Stage 3 Tour de Suisse
 3rd Overall Tour de Picardie
2010
 3rd Gran Premio Industria e Commercio di Prato
2013
 4th Giro dell'Appennino

References

Alessandro Proni's profile on Cycling Base

1982 births
Living people
Italian male cyclists
Tour de Suisse stage winners
Cyclists from Rome